This is a list of localities in Malta and Gozo, sorted by council.

Malta

Ħ'Attard (ATD)
 Attard Industrial Estate - code: ATD 3000
 Ħal Warda (Rose Village) - code: from ATD 1404 - ATD 1409
 Misraħ Kola (Nicholas Square)
 Robbu tal-Ħemsija - code: ATD 4890
 Sant'Anton (Saint Anthony) - code: ATD 1290
 Santa Katerina (Saint Catherine) - code: from ATD 2600 - ATD 2609
 Ta' Fġieni
 Ta' Ħemsija - code: ATD 4890
 Tal-Idward
 Ta' Qali - code: ATD 4854
 Ta' Qali Crafts Village - code: ATD 4000
 Ta' Torba
 Ta' Vnezja
 Tal-Fuklar (Fireplace Estate) - code: from ATD 2481 - ATD 2486
 Tal-Karri (Curry Area) - code: ATD 4000
 Tal-Madliena (Magdalene Area)
 Tal-Madonna (Our Lady Zone)
 Tal-Maltija (Maltese Lady Zone)
 Tal-Mirakli (Miracles Estate)
 Wied Inċita (Incita Valley) - code: ATD 3090
 Wied ta' Rmiedi (Rmiedi Valley)

Ħal Balzan (BZN)
 Buontempo Estate - code: from BZN 1170 - BZN 1177
 Ta' Vestru (Evarist Zone)
 Wied Ħal Balzan (Balzan Valley)- code: from BZN 1401 - BZN 1409

Il-Bidnija (MST)
 Tal-Bidnija
 Tas-Sagra Familja (Holy Family Zone) - code: from MST 5100 to MST 5102
 Ħal Dragu (Dragoon Village)
 Ta' Gebel Ghawzara
 Ta' Braret
 Il-Qolla (The Low Hill)
 Il-Ħolja
 Il-Ħżejjen (The Badest)
 Tal-Milord - code: from MST 5050 to MST 5054
 Wied Qanotta
 Wied Tal-Ħżejjen (Badest Valley)

Il-Birgu (Vittoriosa) (BRG)
 Fuq il-Fortini - code: BRG 2020
 Fuq Tal-Ħawli
 Il-Foss tas-Sur - code: BRG 1220
 It-Toqba tal-Birgu - code: BRG 1740
 Sagra Infirmerija - code: BRG 1410 and BRG 1411
 Tal-Lhud (Jewish Zone) - code: BRG 1330
 Xatt il-Forn - code: BRG 1711
 Xatt ir-Risq (Joy Strand) - code: from BRG 1730 - BRG 1738
 Xatt tal-Birgu (Vittoriosa Waterfront)- code: BRG 1721

Birkirkara (BKR)
 Bwieraq (Berries)- code: from BKR 1210 to BKR 1219
 Fleur-de-Lys
 Għar il-Ġobon (Cheese Cave) - code: from BKR 2700 to BKR 2709
 Ħas-Sajjied (Fisherman Village)- code: from BKR 2400 to BKR 2405
 Laqxija - code: from BKR 2644 to BKR 2655
 Mrieħel (Flocks)
 Ta' Ganu - code: from BKR 1100 to BKR 1109
 Ta' Paris (Paris Area)- code: from BKR 4440 to BKR 4481
 Ta' Sqaq il-Għoġla (Small Cow Alley Zone)
 Tal-Ħerba (Disaster Zone) - code: from BKR 2320 to BKR 2326
 Tal-Maħlut
 Tal-Qattus (Cat Zone)

Birżebbuġa (BBĠ)
 Bengħajsa - code: from BBĠ 3043 to BBĠ 3045
 Borġ in-Nadur- code: from BBĠ
 Brolli
 Girgħien (Huts)
 Għar Dalam (Dalam Cave)
 Għar Ħasan (Hasan Cave)
 Ħal Far (Rat Village)
 Kalafrana (Calafrana)
 L-Imwadar
 Nadur (Birżebbuġa)
 Nigret (Birżebbuġa)
 Pretty Bay
 Qajjenza
 St George's Bay (Birżebbuġa)
 Ta' B'Xejn (Free Zone)
 Ta' Ġiliġejla
 Ta' Salvun
 Ta' Sansajna
 Ta' Żgħer
 Tal-Garda
 Tal-Germun
 Tal-Ġurġier
 Tal-Għawejra
 Tal-Pajtier
 Tal-Papa (Pope Estate)
 Tax-Xerriek
 Wied Dalam (Dalam Valley)
 Wied il-Qoton (Cotton Valley)
 Wied ix-Xoqqa (Lycra Valley)
 Wied Żnuber (Oak Valley)
 Xoqqiet

Bormla (Cospicua) (BML)
 Bieb Bormla
 Fortini Ta' Feliċ
 Fuq San Pawl
 Fuq Verdala (Above Verdala)
 Kortina San Nikola
 Kwartier San Nikola
 Polverista
 San Ġwann t'Għuxa (St. John Estate)
 Xatt ta' Bormla

Ħad-Dingli (DGL)
 Dingli Cliffs
 Ġnien Ġewwieri
 Għar Bittija
 Għar Mirdum
 Dahar (Back)
 Ħal Tartarni (Tartarni)
 Ħawlija
 Il-Ħfar
 Il-Kunfettier (The Confectionery)
 Il-Qaws (The Bow)
 Misraħ Suffara (Whistle Estate)
 Qbiela (The Field Rent)
 Ta' Għamajra
 Ta' Qasam (Estate Zone)
 Tal-Imgħajlaq
 Ta' Newma
 Ta' Rbazza
 Ta' Zekzek
 Tal-Ħamri
 Tal-Ħbula (Ropes Zone)
 Tal-Kalċ (Calcidone Area)
 Tal-Lhudi (Jew Zone)
 Tal-Madliena Barra x-Xagħra
 Ta' Minċejjen
 Tal-Pitkal (Greengrocer Area)
 Tal-Wata
 Tas-Sienja
 Tax-Xatba (Gate Zone)
 Xagħra l-Kbira (The Big Open Field)
 Wied Ħażrun
 Wied il-Bużbież

Il-Fgura (FGR)
 Ta' Ġerman
 Ta' Penza (Penza Area)
 Ta' Sqaq Kubrit  (Cobrite Lane Zone)
 Ta' Tira
 Tal-Foss (Granery Area)
 Tal-Gallu
 Wied Blandun

Il-Furjana (FRN)
 Argotti
 Belt il-Ħażna (Store City)
 Belt is-Sebħ (Sunrise City)
 Crown Works Ditch
 Foss Korni
 Foss ta' Notre Dame
 Hay Wharf (Xatt it-Tiben)
 Il-Mall
 Ozpizio
 Sa' Maison
 Tal-Bombi (Porte Des Bombes)
 Xatt Pinto or Valletta Waterfront

Ħal Għargħur (GĦR)
 Ġwiedi
 Il-Fanal (The Lamp)
 Ta' Żellieqa (Slippery Zone)
 Tal-Ferħa (Happiness Zone)
 Tal-Ħofra (Hole Zone)
 Tax-Xaqquf
 Tax-Xiħ (Old Man Zone)
 Wied Anġlu (Angel Valley)
 Xwieki

Ħal Għaxaq (GXQ)
 Ħal Dmikki
 Ħas-Saptan (Saptan)
 Ta' Garda
 Ta' Loretu (Loreto Zone)
 Tal-Barklor
 Tal-Barrani (Foreigner Zone)
 Tal-Ġebel (Rocks Area)
 Tal-Millieri
 Tal-Qattus (Cat Zone)
 Tal-Wilġa (Open Flat Field Zone)
 Tas-Salib (Cross Zone)

Il-Gudja (GDJ)
 Bir Miftuħ (Open Well)
 Ħal Resqun (Resqun)
 Ta' Bettina (Bettany Area)
 Ta' Loretu (Loreto Zone)
 Ta' Xlejli
 Tal-Ħamra (Red Women Zone)
 Tal-Ħofra (Ditch Area)
 Tal-Lampat
 Tal-Lebbien
 Tal-Mitħna (Mill Zone)
 Tat-Tajjara (Cotton Zone)

Il-Gżira (GŻR)
 Manoel Island
 Tal-Kubrit

Il-Ħamrun (ĦMR)

L-Iklin (IKL)
 Ta' Kieles
 Tal-Balal
 Tat-Tabib (Doctor Area)

Il-Kalkara (KKR)

Ħal Kirkop (KKP)
 Bonu ż-Żgħir
 Qasam Tal-Menħir (Menhir Estate)
 Tal-Aħfar
 Tal-Isqof (Bishop Zone)
 Tal-Fieres
 Tal-Iblieq
 Tas-Sienja
 Taż-Żebbiegħ (Painter Zone)

Ħal Lija (LJA)
 Ħal Bordi
 Ħal Mann
 Ta' Bajdun
 Ta' Seguna
 Tad-Daħla (Entrance Area)
 Tal-Mirakli (Miracles Zone)
 Wied Lija (Lija Valley)

Ħal Luqa (LQA)
 Bir-Ġurat (Grasshopper Well)
 Cargo Village
 Għammieri
 Ingiered
 Ħal Farruġ
 Luqa Industrial Zone
 Taċ-Ċawla
 Tal-Bandieri (Flags Zone)
 Tal-Ħabaq
 Tal-Maħżnier
 Tal-Vitorja (Victory Zone)
 Ta' San Tumas (St. Thomas Area)
 Ta' Wied Knejjes (Churches Valley Zone)
 Wied Betti
 Xagħra tas-Simar

Il-Marsa (MRS)
 Albert Town
Parocca SSMA Trinita' 
Parocca Marija Ragina 
Triq Il-Marsa 
 Belt il-Ġdida (New City)
 Belt il-Ħażna (Store City)
 Il-Menħa
 Il-Menqa
 Il-Wilġa (Dock No.7)
 Marsa Industrial Estate
 Il-Marsa Tal-Ingliżi (English Marsa)
Belvedere Gardens 
 Spencer Gardens
 Ta' Ċejlu
 Ta' Ċeppuna
 Ta' Faqqani
 Tal-Qtates (Cats Zone)
 Tat-Tromba
 Xatt il-Qwabar

Marsaskala or Wied il-Għajn (MSK)
 Barumbara
 Bellavista
 Bidni (Marsaskala)
 Il-Gżira (Marsaskala) (The Island)
 Il-Ħamrija
 Il-Magħluq (The Closing)
 Kappara (Marsaskala) (Capres)
 Mitquba
 Nadur (Marsaskala)
 Noqra
 Sant' Antnin (Saint Anthony)
 St. Thomas Bay
 Ta' Gidwet
 Ta' Monita
 Tal-Isqof (Bishop Zone)
 Tad-Dawl (Light Zone)
 Tal-Blajjiet
 Tal-Bujjar Estate
 Tal-Gardiel
 Tas-Sienja
 Żonqor

Marsaxlokk (MXK)
 Ballut (Marsaxlokk)
 Delimara
 Ħal Ġinwi
 Il-Fossa (The Granery)
 Il-Magħluq (Marsaxlokk) (The Closing)
 Kavallerizza
 Marnisi
 Tal-Qrejten
 Tal-Wiċċ (Face Zone)
 Tas-Silġ (Ice Zone)
 Tat-Trunċiera
 Tax-Xerriek
 Xrob l-Għaġin

L-Imdina (MDN)
 Connaught Garden
 Ġnien Ħira
 Howard Garden
 Ta' Taħt is-Sur

Il-Mellieħa (MLĦ)
 Anchor Bay
 Armier Bay
 Iċ-Ċirkewwa
 Daħlet ix-Xilep
 Daħlet ix-Xmajjar (Rivers Creek)
 Ġnien ta' Xatba (Gate's Garden)
 L-Għadira (Lake)
 Għajn Ħadid (Iron Spring)
 Għajn Tuffieħa (Apple's Spring)
 Għajn Żejtuna (Olive Fruit Spring)
 Għar Baqrat
 Ġnien Ingraw
 Ħabel Ċillaq
 Ħal Ferħ (Happy Village)
 Il-Kortin
 Il-Moxa ta' Għajn Tuffieħa
 L-Aħrax tal-Mellieħa
 Little Armier
 Marfa
 Manikata
 Mġiebaħ
 Miżieb
 Naħħalija
 Paradise Bay
 Popeye Village
 Qasam Barrani (Foreigner Estate)
 Qortin
 Ramla ta' Wied Musa (Musa Valley Sandy Beach)
 Ramla tal-Bir (Will Sandy Beach)
 Ramla tal-Qortin
 Ramla tat-Torri (Tower Sandy Beach)
 Red Tower
 Sagħtar
 Santa Maria Estate
 Selmun
 Ta' Fuq il-Widien (Above the Valleys Zone)
 Tal-Arġentier
 Tal-Għollieqa
 Tal-Imgħarrqa
 Ta' Masrija
 Ta' Pennellu
 Ta' Qargħa
 Ta' Qassisu
 Ta' Skrajda
 Ta' Taħt l-Irdum (Below the Cliff Zone)
 Tal-Braġ
 Tas-Salib (Cross Zone)
 Tas-Sellun
 Xagħra l-Ħamra
 Xatt Santa Marija

L-Imġarr (MĠR)
 Abatija (Abbey)
 Binġemma
 Ċagħaq (Pebbles)
 Ċarċara
 Dar il-Ħamra (Red Home)
 Darrenzi
 Dwejra (Mġarr) (Small House)
 Falka
 Fomm ir-Riħ
 Ġnejna (Small Garden)
 Għajn Tuffieħa (Apple's Spring)
 Id-Dahar (The Back) _
 Il-Għalqa (The Field)
 Is-Santi
 L-Imġarr ta' Ġewwa
 L-Iskirvit
 Lippija
 Misraħ Miet (Dead Estate)
 Skorba
 Tal-Għajn (Spring Zone)
 Ta' Ħaġrat
 Tal-Imselliet
 Ta' Mrejnu
 Ta' Qarawas
 Ta' Tewma (Garlic Zone)
 Tal-Faċċol (Double Face Zone0
 Tal-Ħawlija
 Tal-Ħżejjen
 Tal-Palma
 Tal-Qanfud (Hatchok Zone)
 Tar-Ragħad (Lighting Zone)
 Żebbiegħ (Painter)

Il-Mosta (MST)
 Bajjad (Painter)
 Beżbiżija
 Blata l-Għolja (High Rock)
 Għallis
 Għoqod
 Ħabel Gendus (Oxen Rope)
 Ħanqa
 Ħatba l-Bajda (White Coal)
 Il-Folju
 Mosta Technopark
 San Ġużepp Tat-Tarġa (Saint Joseph of the Stairs)
 San Pawl tal-Qliegħa
 San Silvestru (Saint Silvester)
 Santa Margerita (Saint Margreth)
 Ta' Bistra
 Ta' Ħammud
 Tal-Awrora (Aurora Zone)
 Tal-Isperanza
 Ta' Luċija (Lucy Zone)
 Ta' Maċedonja (Macedonia Zone)
 Ta' Mlit
 Ta' Redusa
 Ta' Srajġu
 Ta' Vnezja
 Ta' Xkora (Sack Zone)
 Ta' Xorxa
 Ta' Zokkrija
 Taċ-Ċawla (Mosta)
 Tad-Daqqaq (Cotton Maker Zone)
 Tad-Dib
 Tal-Gwerra (War Zone)
 Tal-Għażżi
 Tal-Ħanżira (Female Pig Zone)
 Tal-Mellu
 Tal-Qares (Sour Zone)
 Tal-Qawwi
 Tal-Wata
 Tal-Wieġ
 Tas-Sriedek
 Tat-Torba
 Tarġa Gap
 Xagħriet Ta' Fraxku
 Wied Ġjananu
 Wied Għajn Riħana (Windy Spring Valley)
 Wied il-Għasel (Honey Valley)
 Wied il-Qlejja
 Wied Ta' Kieli (Michael's Valley)
 Wied tal-Isperanza

L-Imqabba (MQB)
 Binja Ħarriġiet
 Binja Sptar Qadim
 Ħal Millieri
 Tal-Ħaġra (Gem Zone)
 Tal-Landier
 Tal-Mintna
 Tas-Sejba
 Tat-Torba
 Tax-Xantin
 Tax-Xatba l-Ħamra (Reddish Gate Zone)

L-Imsida (MSD)
 Misraħ il-Barrieri (Quarries Estate)
 Msida Circus
 Msida Strand
 Swatar
 Ta' Sisla
 Ta' Ziza
 Tal-Għeriebel
 Tal-Ħofra
 Tal-Ħriereb
 Tal-Qroqq (Owl Zone)
 Tat-Tigan

L-Imtarfa (MTF)
 Belt il-Ġmiel
 Binja Ġebel id-Dwejra
 Buqana
 Ħaż-Żmien (Era Village)
 Marġ
 Mtarfa Blokks
 Sandar
 Santa Luċija (Mtarfa) (Saint Lucy)
 Tabja
 Ta' Sagħat
 Ta' Slampa
 Tal-Għeriexem
 Tal-Maħruq
 Tal-Palma (Palm Zone)
 Tar-Rangu
 Tat-Tokk Heights

In-Naxxar (NXR)
 Baħar iċ-Ċaghaq (Pebbles' Golf)
 Binġjala
 Birguma
 Għalis
 Ġjovadu
 Għaqba
 Ħad-Dgħejf
 Ħal Mulsulmett
 Is-Sgħajtar
 Magħtab
 Mejjieli
 Naxxar Gap
 Nigret (Naxxar)
 Ta' Alla u Ommu (God and His Mother Zone)
 Ta' Mezzi
 Tal-Wej
 Qasam San Ġorġ (Saint George Estate)
 Qalet Marku
 Qrejten
 Salina
 San Ġwann Evanġelista (Saint John the Evangelist)
 San Mikiel (Saint Michael)
 San Pawl tat-Tarġa (Saint Paul of the Step)
 Santa Katarina (Saint Catherine)
 Santa Marija tax-Xagħra
 Ta' Latmija
 Tal-Ħotba l-Bajda
 Xwiegħi
 Wied Bordi (Bordi Valley)
 Wied Filep (Philep Valley)
 Wied il-Faħam (Coal Valley)

Raħal Ġdid (Paola) (PLA)
 Addolorata
 Corradino Industrial Estate
 Għajn Dwieli
 Kordin
 Ordinanza
 Qortin
 Ras Ħanżir (Pig Point)
 Ta' Lourdes (Lourdes Zone)
 Tax-Xewk
 Xatt il-Laboratorji

Pembroke (PBK)
 Medisle Village
 St Andrew's
 St Patrick's, Malta
 White Rocks

Tal-Pietà (PTA)
 Gwardamanġa
 Ta' Braxia

Ħal Qormi (QRM)
 Fuq Tal-Blat (Above the Rock)
 Il-Wilġa (The Open Field)
 L-Armier
 L-Erba' Qaddisin
 L-Istabar
 Qormi San Bastjan (Saint Sebestian Zone Qormi)
 Qormi San Ġorġ (Saint George Zone Qormi)
 Ta' Farzina
 Ta' Paskarella (Pascarella Zone)
 Ta' San Ġwakkin
 Tad-Dwieli
 Tal-Andar
 Tal-Bajjada
 Tal-Ħandaq
 Tal-Ħlas
 Wied il-Kbir (Grand Valley)
 Wied is-Sewda (Negro Valley)

Il-Qrendi (QRD)
 Blue Grotto
 Fulija
 Gwejdija
 Għar ix-Xagħra
 Ħaġar Qim
 Ħal Lew
 Ħal Manin
 Ħatba
 Il-Ħofra (Qrendi)
 Il-Maqluba
 L-Ilsna (The Tongues)
 Msella tas-Suldati
 Qasam Tal-Warda(Rose Zone Estate)
 Ras il-Bajjada (Painters Point)
 San Niklaw (Saint Nicholas)
 Ta' Ġuarena
 Ta' Gana
 Ta' Ħassajtek
 Tal-Gawwija
 Tal-Ħniena (Mercy Zone)
 Tas-Siġra (Tree Zone)
 Tas-Suldati (Soldiers Zone)
 Wied Ħoxt
 Wied iż-Żurrieq (Zurrieq Valley)
 Żellieqa (Slippery)

Ir-Rabat, Malta (RBT)
 Baħrija (Moth)
 Bieb ir-Ruwa
 Binġemma
 Buqana
 Buskett (Forest)
 Dwejra (Rabat)
 Fiddien
 Fomm ir-Riħ (Wind's Mouth)
 Ġnien Fieres
 Ġnien il-Kbir (Grand Garden)
 Għajn Klieb (Dogs' Spring)
 Għajn Kajjet
 Għajn Kajjet Housing Estate
 Għajn Tajba
 Għar Barka
 Għar-Żerriegħa
 Għemieri
 Gwiedi (Baħrija)
 Ħal Bajjada (Painters Village)
 Ħofra ta' Ritz
 Iċ-Ċanta
 Iċ-Ċens l-Iswed
 Il-Kanuni (The Canons)
 Il-Katakombi
 Il-Kunċizzjoni (The Immaculate Conception)
 Il-Mejda (The Table)
 Il-Ponta
 Is-Salvatur (The Saviour)
 L-Isfel mill-Palazz
 Landrijiet
 Migra Ferħa
 Mtaħleb
 Nadur (Rabat)
 Nigret (Rabat)
 Nigret tal-Ħarruba
 Qattara
 Raba' Nemel
 Sant' Agata (Saint Agatha)
 Santa Katerina (Rabat) (Saint Catherine)
 Saqqajja
 Swatar (Rabat)
 Tabja
 Ta' Busugrilla
 Ta' Fantin
 Ta' Frajna
 Ta' Franton
 Ta' Gerżuma
 Ta' Lawrenti
 Ta' Manduca
 Ta' Namura
 Ta' Qasgħa
 Ta' Rbazza
 Ta' Rużarju
 Ta' Sirena
 Ta' Żeppita
 Taċ-Ċagħki
 Tal-Forok
 Tal-Ħamri
 Tal-Laqnija
 Tal-Lunzjata (Annuciation Zone)
 Tal-Marġa
 Tal-Markiż
 Tal-Milord
 Tal-Virtù
 Tas-Salib
 Tas-Santi (Saints Zone)
 Tat-Tilliera
 Tat-Torri (Tower Zone)
 Tax-Xieref
 Wied Rini (Rini Valley)
 Wied Gerżuma
 Wied iż-Żebbuġ (Olives Valley)
 Wied Liemu
 Wied tal-Isqof (Bishop's Valley)
 Wied tal-Marġa
 Xagħra Ħurija
 Xagħra tal-Isqof

Ħal Safi (SFI)
 Il-Għadir
 Qerd in-Naħal
 Ta' Amparell
 Ta' Ħlantun
 Ta' Karwija
 Ta' Rqajja
 Ta' Sant' Agata (Saint Agatha Zone)
 Tal-Ibraġ (Ħal Safi)
 Tal-Aħwar
 Tal-Kwadru (Frame Zone)
 Tal-Palma (Palm Zone)
 Wara l-Ġnien (Behind the Garden)

San Ġwann (SĠN)
 Fuq Wied Għomor
 L-Imsieraħ
 Kappara
 Mensija
 Misraħ Lewża
 Qasbija
 San Ġwann Industrial Estate
 Ta' Ċieda
 Ta' Ġnien Fonsu
 Ta' Marmora
 Ta' Żwejt
 Tal-Balal
 Tal-Mejda
 Tar-Raddiena
 Tat-Tabib
 The Village
 Wied Għomor

Santa Luċija (SLĊ)
 Bir-Ġurat (Grasshopper Will)
 L-Isqajjaq t'Isfel (The Southern Lanes)
 Roqba
 Ta' Garnaw
 Ta' Garriba
 Wied Betti

Santa Venera (SVR)
 Misraħ il-Barrieri (Quarries Estate)
 Mrieħel Industrial Estate
 Ta' Fuq Wied (Above the Valley Zone)

L-Isla (Senglea) (ISL)

 Hneja
 Barklor

Is-Siġġiewi (SĠW)
 Fawwara
 Girgenti
 Għar il-Kbir (Grand Cave)
 Għar Lapsi (Asuncion Cave)
 Għar Mundu (Raymond Cave)
 Ħal Kbir (Grand Village)
 Ħal Niklusi (Nicholas Village)
 Ħax-Xluq
 Ħesri
 Qajjied
 Ta' Brandin
 Ta' Brija
 Ta' Dun Konz
 Ta' Fuq il-Blat (Above the Rocks Zone)
 Ta' Għaqba
 Ta' Kandja
 Ta' Kirċippu
 Tal-Għolja (Hill Zone)
 Ta' Raba'
 Ta' Żagi
 Ta' Żuta
 Tal-Providenza (Providence Zone)
 Wied Ħesri
 Wied il-Girgenti (Girgenti Valley)
 Wied il-Luq
 Wied Xkora (Sack Valley)

Tas-Sliema (SLM)
 Font Għadir
 Għar id-Dud (Worms Cave)
 Qui-Si-Sana
 Savoy
 Tigne Point

San Ġiljan (STJ)
 Balluta
 Dragonara Point
 Fuq il-Ġonna
 Paceville
 Portomaso
 Qaliet (Creeks)
 Spinola
 St George's Bay (St Julians)
 St Julians Bay
 Ta' Giorni
 The Gardens
 Wied tal-Balluta (Balluta's Valley)

San Pawl il-Baħar (SPB)
 Bognor Beach
 Burmarrad
 Buġibba
 Ġonna tal-Barbier (Barber's Gardens)
 Il-Ħamra (The Reddish)
 Il-Magħruq
 Il-Miżieb
 Il-Qadi
 Kennedy Grove
 Mdawra (Surrounding)
 Mistra Bay
 Pwales Beach
 Qawra
 San Martin (Saint Martin's)
 San Pawl Milqi
 Simar, Malta
 Ta' Ċampra
 Ta' Erba' Mwieżeb
 Ta' Limbordin
 Tal-Basal (Onions Zone)
 Tal-Fjuri (Flowers Zone)
 Tal-Għażżenin (Tiried Zone)
 Tal-Qarbuni
 Tal-Veċċa
 Wardija (Flowerly)
 Wied Qannotta
 Wied Sardin
 Xagħra Tal-Bandieri
 Xemxija (Sunny)

Is-Swieqi (SWQ)
 Fuq Wied Għomar
 Ġbejjen (Cheeslets)
 High Ridge
 Ibraġ
 Iċ-Ċink
 Il-Madliena (Magdalene)
 Slielem tal-Madliena (Magdalene's Leaders)
 Ta' Stronka
 Tal-Għoqod
 Tal-Franċiż (Frenchman Zone)
 Upper Gardens
 Victoria Gardens
 Wied id-Dis
 Wied Mexju

Ħal Tarxien (TXN)
 Birbixkilla
 Ħal Għarrat
 Il-Qalgħa
 L-Isqajjaq (The Lanes)
 Tal-Patri (The Brother Zone)
 Ħal-Saflieni
 Tas-Salib (Cross Zone)

Ta' Xbiex (XBX)
 Lazaretto Creek

Il-Belt Valletta (VLT)
 Fort St Elmo
 Il-Fossa
 Lascaris Wharf
 Mandraġġ
 Taħt iż-Żiemel (Below the Horse)

Ix-Xgħajra (XJR)
 Ras il-Ġebel (Rocks Point)
 San Pietru (Saint Peter)
 Ta' Alessi
 Tal-Qassisin (Priests Zone)
 Tan-Nisa (Women Zone)
 Tumbrell
 Wied Glavan

Ħaż-Żabbar (ŻBR)
 Biċċieni
 Bieb is-Sultan (King Arch)
 Buleben iż-Żgħir
 Ħas-Sajd (Fishing Village)
 Ħawlija
 Dun Lanża
 In-Naħla
 L-Imwieġel
 Santa Domenika
 Ta' Ċiantar
 Ta' Latnija
 Ta' Maġġi
 Tal-Ħamra
 Tal-Ħofra (Hole Zone)
 Tal-Plier
 Wied ta' Mazza (Mazza Valley)

Ħaż-Żebbuġ (Malta) (ŻBĠ)
 Għar Ram (Copper Cave)
 Ħabel Mustaċċi (Moustaches Rope)
 Ħal Dwien
 Ħal Mula
 Ħal Muxi
 Ħal Sajd (Fishing Village)
 Ta' Srina
 Tal-Infetti
 Ta' Wiċċ ir-Raħal (Town's Face Zone)
 Ta' Żaruna
 Tal-Imgħażel
 Tad-Dawl (Light Zone)
 Tal-Andar
 Tal-Gandlora
 Tal-Grazzja (Grace Zone)
 Tal-Għarbi (Arab Zone)
 Tar-Ramel (Sand Zone)
 Wied il-Baqqiegħa
 Wied Qirda
 Wied ta' San Martin (Saint Martin's Valley)

Iż-Żejtun (ŻTN)
 Bir id-Deheb (Gold's Well)
 Bisqallin (Sicilians Zone)
 Bulebel Industrial Estate
 Bulebel il-Kbir
 Ġebel San Martin (Saint Martin Estate)
 Gwiedi (Small Hills)
 Ħajt il-Wied (Valley's Wall)
 Ħal Bajda (Egg's Village)
 Ħal Bisbut
 Ħal Ġwann (John's Village)
 Ħal Tmiem (Ending Village)
 Tal-Ħerba (Disaster)
 Il-Bajjada (The Painters)
 Il-Minżel
 L-Iskorra l-Kbira
 Ir-Raħal ta' Fuq (Upper Town)
 Ir-Raħal t'Isfel (Southern Town)
 Ras il-Wied (Valley Point)
 Ta' San Girgor (St. Gregory's Estate)
 San Kelment (Saint Clement)
 Strenju
 Ta' Ganza
 Ta' Klement (Clement Zone)
 Ta' Pizzuta
 Ta' Salvaturi (Saviours Zone)
 Ta' Tavlin
 Ta' Tnella
 Tal-Usif
 Tal-Ħotba
 Tal-Kotob
 Wied iz-Ziju (Uncle's Valley)
 Xewkija (Żejtun)

Iż-Żurrieq (ŻRQ)
 Bubaqra
 Ġarġir
 Ħlantun
 Il-Bajjada
 Il-Miżieb
 Il-Munqar
 Nigret
 Il-Qortin
 Ta' Ħal Lew
 Ta' Ħarbux
 Ta' Sant' Agatha (Saint Agatha Zone)
 Ta' Taħt iċ-Ċint (Below the Wall Zone)
 Ta' Xaqqa
 Tal-Għerien (Caves Zone)
 Taċ-Ċantar
 Tal-Bambina
 Tal-Bebbux (Snails Zone)
 Tal-Ġibjun
 Tal-Għarajjex
 Tal-Kmand (Commander Zone)
 Tirxija
 Xarolla
 Wied Babu
 Wied Fulija
 Wied Ganu
 Wied Maqbul
 Wied Moqbal

Gozo

Il-Fontana or It-Triq tal-Għajn (FNT)
 Fuq il-Lunzjata (Above Annuciation)
 Is-Saqwi (Flourish Fields)
 Wied Siekel (Siekel Valley)
 Wied Tal-Lunzjata (Annuciation Valley)

Għajnsielem (GSM)
 Borġ Għarib
 Cominotto
 Comino
 Fort Chambrai
 Għar ix-Xiħ
 Gudja (Għajnsielem) (Small Hill)
 Iċ-Ċens (The Rent)
 Mġarr Port
 Miġiaro
 Mrejżbiet
 Rdum it-Tafal (Clay Cliff)
 Ta' Briegħen
 Ta' Cordina (Cordina Zone)
 Ta' Kusbejja
 Ta' Sant' Eliju (Saint Eliah Zone)
 Tal-Palma (Palm Zone)
 Xatt l-Aħmar (Reddish Strand)
 Żewwieqa

L-Għarb (GRB)
 Birbuba
 Għammar
 Ħodba
 Il-Wileġ (Big Fields)
 San Dimitri (Saint Dimitrus)
 San Katald (Saint Catald)
 San Pietru (Saint Peter)
 Ta' Dbiegi Crafts Village
 Ta' Lamuta
 Ta' Pinu
 Ta' Santu (Saint Zone)
 Tal-Fgura (Figure Area)
 Taż-Żejt (Oil Zone)
 Wara l-Bjut (Behind The Roofs)

L-Għasri (GSR)
 Għammar
 Ta' Bubunu (Big Marble Area)
 Ta' Landar
 Tal-Kanun (Canone Zone)
 Tal-Knisja (Church Zone)
 Wied il-Għasri (Ghasri Valley)
 Wied Sara (Sahra Valley)

Ta' Kerċem (KĊM)
 Fuq il-Blat (Above the Rocks)
 Ġebel San Ġorġ
 Għadira Ta' San Raflu (Saint Rapheal Lake)
 Għajn Abdul (Abdulah Spring)
 Għar Ilma (Water Cave)
 Iċ-Ċnus (The Rents)
 Klula
 Lekx
 Qasam San Ġorġ (St. George Estate)
 Qasam San Pawl (St. Paul Estate)
 Santa Luċija
 Ta' Berrini
 Ta' Ċajplu
 Ta' Ġanton
 Ta' Katas
 Ta' Summina
 Ta' Xewka
 Ta' Xkura (Sack Zone)
 Tal-Warda (Rose Zone)
 Tar-Riefnu
 Wied Ħmar (Donkey Valley)
 Xagħri

Il-Munxar (MXR) and Ix-Xlendi (XLN)
 Bajjada
 Il-Mejda (Munxar) (The Table)
 Is-Sidra (The Breast)
 It-Taksis (The Taxis)
 Kantra
 Qsajjam (Small Estate)
 Ras il-Bajda (Egg Point)
 Ras Maħrax
 Sanap
 Ta' Kamleta
 Ta' Luvier
 Ta' Merżiena
 Ta' Rinota
 Ta' Valletta (Valletta Area)
 Ta' Xaman
 Tar-Riefnu
 Wied tal-Kantra
 Xlendi
 Xlendi Valley

In-Nadur (NDR)
 Bin Ġemma
 Daħlet Qorrot
 Ġebel l-Aħmar (Reddish Rock)
 Għajn Berta
 Għajn Qasab
 Nadur Heights
 Qortin (Nadur)
 Ramla
 San Blas Bay
 Sejtun
 Ta' Dwardu (Edward Zone)
 Ta' Grunju
 Ta' Hida
 Ta' Kenuna
 Ta' Kuxxina
 Ta' Mattiju (Matthew Zone)
 Ta' Patrik (Patrick Zone)
 Ta' Said (Said Zone)
 Ta' Sardina
 Ta' Spilotti
 Ta' Venuta
 Ta' Wistin
 Tad-Duru
 Tal-Ħanaq
 Tal-Ħawli (Nadur)
 Tal-Laċċa
 Tal-Weraq (Leaves Area)
 Tat-Tiġrija
 Tax-Xemx (Sun Area)
 Tax-Xini
 Wied Binġemma
 Xurdin

Il-Qala (QLA)
 Andar il-Qadim
 Andar ix-Xagħri
 Dar is-Sapra
 Ġebel Barbaġanni
 Ġebel tal-Ħalfa
 Għajn Ħaġar
 Għajn Kalment
 Ħondoq ir-Rummien
 Il-Bajjad (Qala) The Painter
 Il-Ħanaq (Qala)
 Il-Qortin (Qala)
 Il-Wardija The Flowerly
 Ta' Berqa Lighting Zone
 Ta' Gafan
 Ta' Kassja
 Ta' Semper
 Tal-Ħalq
 Tal-Ħerep
 Tal-Mintuff
 Tax-Xulliel
 Wied Biljun (Billion Valley)
 Wied Simar
 Wied Tal-Blata

Ir-Rabat(VCT)
 Belliegħa
 Bieb l-Imdina
 Citadel or Iċ-Ċittadella
 Dahar il-Ħmar
 Demnija
 Forn il-Ġir
 Gelmus
 Għajn Lukin
 Il-Ġnien (The Garden)
 Ta' Mliet
 Ta' Wara s-Sur (Gozo) (Behind the Bastions)
 Tal-Ibraġ (Gozo)
 Taċ-Ċawla
 Taflija
 Tal-Far (Rat Zone)
 Tal-Grazzja (Gozo) (Grace Area)
 Tal-Maltija (Gozo) (Maltese Lady Area)
 Tal-Mejda (Table Area)
 Żenqa

San Lawrenz (SLZ)
 Dwejra (Small House)
 Funghus Rock or Ġebla tal-Ġeneral
 Fuq il-Qawra
 Fuq it-Tieqa
 Fuq tal-Bniet
 Ġebel Ben Ġorġ
 Inland Sea
 Mendbin
 Mixta
 Ta' Bieb il-Għar (Cave Entrance Area)
 Ta' Ċangura
 Tad-Debba (Mare Zone)
 Tat-Torri (Tower Zone)
 Wied Guno (Guno Valley)
 Wied il-Kbir (Gozo) (The Grand Valley)

Ta' Sannat (SNT)
 Iċ-Ċnus (The Rents)
 Fuq tal-Gruwwa
 Il-Ħofra (Sannat) (The Hole)
 Mġarr ix-Xini
 Ta' Bardan
 Ta' Ċenċ
 Ta' Dun Nastas (Father Nastas Zone)
 Ta' Durell
 Ta' Randu
 Ta' Seguna
 Ta' Żebetta
 Tal-Gruwwa
 Tax-Xamgħan

Ix-Xagħra (XRA)
 Calypso
 Ġgantija
 Għajn Barrani
 Għajn Damma (Dice Spring)
 Għajn Lukin
 Għajn Meddew
 Għajn Sellum (Leader Spring)
 Għajn Xegħjba
 Is-Sruġ
 It-Tafla (The Clay)
 Il-Pergla
 Santa Verna (Saint Venera)
 Ta' Bullara
 Ta' Dun Anton (Father Anthony Zone)
 Ta' Gajdoru
 Ta' Germida
 Ta' Gorf
 Tal-Għejjun (Springs Zone)
 Ta' Nenus
 Ta' Xħajma
 Tal-Kaċċaturi (Hunters Zone)
 Tal-Kanal (Channel Zone)
 Tal-Qanfud (Hatchok Zone)
 Tan-Nazzarenu (Nazzaerth Man Zone)
 Tas-Singura
 Wied Ġnien Imrik
 Wied l-Għeżien (Tiried Man Valley)

Ix-Xewkija (XWK)
 Mġarr ix-Xini
 Ta' Bakkari
 Ta' Ġokk (Joint Zone)
 Tal-Ħamrija (Soil Area)
 Tal-Ħniena (Xewkija) (Mercy Zone)
 Tal-Barmil (Bouqet Zone)
 Tal-Gruwa
 Tal-Lambert
 Tal-Loġġa
 Ta' Gorgun
 Tal-Lewz
 Tar-Rummiena
 Xewkija Industrial Estate
 Ta' Hida
 Ta' Hamet
 Tax-Xhajma
 Tal-Horob
 Tal-Kus
 Ta' Hanzira
 It-Taflija
 Tal-Gidi
 Ic-Cnus
 Tal-Gonna
 Ta' Majmuna
 Ir-Rummiena
 Tal-Francizi
 Tas-Salvatur
 Il-Wilga
 Ta-Cafura
 Tas-Salvatur
 Ta' l-Ehbiel
 Tal-Kanal
 Tal-Blankas
 Ta' l-Imghajjen
 San Anard
 Tal-Lunzjata
 Habel is-Sierja
 Il-bajat tal-Madonna
 Ta' Trajsu
 Tal-Knisja
 Tas-Saborra
 Il-Misrah

Iż-Żebbuġ (Gozo) (ŻBB) and Marsalforn (MFN)
 Għajn Melel
 Għajn Qaċċat
 Għar Qawqla
 Il-Mielħa (The Salty)
 Il-Wilġa (The Open Field)
 Marsalforn
 Menqa (Marsalforn)
 Merżuq
 Ponta Santa Marija (Saint Mary Point)
 Qbajjar Bay
 Qolla s-Safra (Yellow Hill)
 Rdum ta' Kililu
 Ta' Barda
 Ta' Ċikku
 Ta' Fra Beż
 Ta' Ġienu
 Ta' Kuljat
 Ta' Saliba
 Tal-Erbgħa (The Four Zone)
 Taċ-Ċaqra
 Ta' Abram (Abraham Zone)
 Tal-Barumbara
 Tal-Għarejjex
 Tal-Ħluq (Mouths Zone)
 Tal-Kanun (Canone Area)
 Tal-Leveċa
 Tal-Milied (Christmas Zone)
 Tas-Salvatur (Saviours Zone)
 Tas-Sellum (Leader Zone)
 Tat-Tafla (Blue-Clay Zone)
 Wied Marsalforn
 Xwejni Bay

See also
 Local councils of Malta

 
Localities
Malta